Anolis porcatus, the Cuban green anole, is a species of anole lizard that is native to Cuba, but has been introduced to Florida, the Dominican Republic, São Paulo, and Tenerife.

The Cuban green anole is part of the A. carolinensis group of anoles.

References

Anoles
Lizards of the Caribbean
Endemic fauna of Cuba
Reptiles of Cuba
Reptiles described in 1840
Taxa named by John Edward Gray
Reptiles of the Dominican Republic